= Karudzhikh =

- Location within Azerbaijan
- Coordinates: 39°10′N 46°01′E
- Country: Azerbaijan
- Autonomous republic: Nakhchivan
- Time zone: UTC+4 (AZT)
  - Summer (DST): UTC+5 (AZT)

Karudzhikh is a village in the Nakhchivan Autonomous Republic of Azerbaijan.
